Závadka is a village and municipality in the Gelnica in the Košice Region of eastern Slovakia.

Villages and municipalities in Gelnica District